Yuriy Bondarenko Volodymyrovych (born 14 January 1972) is a Soviet and Ukrainian retired football defender.

Career

FC Desna Chernihiv
Yuriy Bondarenko was born in the city  of Chernihiv and he started his career with the SDYuShOR Desna, the young team of Desna Chernihiv. In 1988 he made his debut with Desna Chernihiv, the senior team in Soviet Second League in the 1988 until 1994, where he played 157 games and scored 6 goals. The team gave him the right to start in the First Lizi of Ukraine because of the fall of the SRCP. On the 16th fierce 1992 rock debut in the Ukrainian zmagannyi in the unfinished (0: 1) visibility match of the 1/32 final of the Ukrainian Cup against Vorskla Poltava. Yuriy viyshov on the field in the starting warehouse and played the whole match. First Lizi of Ukraine made his debut on March 28, 1992 in a cross-country (2: 0) home play of the 4th round of a group 1 against Chortkiv's "Kristal". Bondarenko viyshov on the field on 80th grade, replacing Valentin Buglak.
The first ball at the First Lizi of Ukraine is the 10th worm of 1992 on the 68th hviliiny peremogy (1: 0) home match of the 23rd round of the 1st round against the Cherkasy "Dnipr". Yuriy viyshov on the field in the starting warehouse and saw the whole match.

Torpedo Zaporizhzhia & "Vinnytsia
In 1993, he moved to Torpedo Zaporizhzhia The football club of Zaporizhzhia until 1997, where he played 89 games and scored 9 goals. He debut at home in the 17th round of the Vyshcha Liha against Zorya-MALS. Bondarenko viyshov on the field on the 20th hviliin, replacing Oleksandr Asipov. The debut goal of the top-players' football player was designated on April 22, 1994, for the 65th season of the programmed (1: 2) home match of the 25th round against the constipated Metalurh Donetsk. Yuriy viyshov on the field in the starting warehouse and played the whole match. The team has won three and a half seasons, won 89 matches (9 goals), and 11 more matches (1 goal) won the Ukrainian Cup. In 1997 until 2000 he played for Nyva Vinnytsia in the city of Vinnytsia where he played 98 scoring 5 goals. On 30 April 1997 he made his debut He made a debut in the home match of the 1st round of the Ukrainian First League against Zorya Luhansk ended 3:0. Bondarenko viyshov on the field on the 46th grade, having replaced Oleksandr Laktionov, and on the 53rd grade, due to the debut goal for the new team. Having played for the team for three half seasons, in a whole hour the First Leader of Ukraine won 98 matches (5 goals), more than 9 matches (2 goals) won the Ukrainian Cup.

Podillya Khmelnytskyi & Desna
Before the start of the 2000/01 season, I moved to Podillya Khmelnytskyi. The Khmelnytskyi football club debuted 20 sickle 2000 rock in the second round (2: 0) home match of the second round of group B of Ukrainian First League against Hirnyk-Sport Horishni Plavni. Bondarenko viyshov on the field in the starting warehouse, and on the 46th grade he replaced Vitaliy Rashik. Tsey match appeared by one for the attacker at the football player of Podillya Khmelnytskyi.

Before the hour of winter break the seasons 2000 he returned to Desna Chernihiv playing 15 games scoring 1 goal and 1 match with Podillya Khmelnytskyi. The football club of the Chernihiv club made its debut on 25 March 2001 in the unfinished (0: 2) visibility match of the 15th round of the group "V" of the Other League of Ukraine against the Zaporizka "SDYUSHOR-Metallurg". Yuriy viyshov on the field in the starting warehouse, and on the 63rd day he replaced Kostyantin Poznyak. The debut goal for Desna Chernihiv on May 19, 2001, to the 82nd bad luck (5: 0) in the 24th round of the Group B of the Other League of Ukraine against the Alchevsk “Steel-2”. Bondarenko viyshov on the field in the starting warehouse and played the whole match. The football club of the Chernigivskyi club played for the second seasons, for a whole hour the Other Lizi won 46 matches (2 goals), more than 1 matches for the Ukrainian Cup.

Completed professional Career
In 2002, there were 3 provinces in the Ukrainian Amateur Football Championship for FC Nizhyn. In summer 2002 he got transfers at Stal Kamianske, where he played 15 games. The football club of Dniprodzerzhynsk club made its debut in the 8th spring of 2002 in a cross-country (5: 1) match of the 6th round of the group "B" of the Other League of Ukraine against Donetsk "Metallurg-2". Yuriy viyshov on the field in the starting warehouse and played the whole match. “Stal” has played a non-new season, for a whole hour the Other Lizi of Ukraine has 15 matches. At the end of the 2002/03 season, he finished the career of a football player.

Honours
Desna Chernihiv
 Ukrainian Second League: 2000–01

References

External links 
Profile on website 
Profile on website 

1972 births
Living people
Soviet footballers
Ukrainian footballers
Footballers from Chernihiv
FC Desna Chernihiv players
FC Torpedo Zaporizhzhia players
FC Podillya Khmelnytskyi players
FC Nyva Vinnytsia players
Association football midfielders
Association football defenders